Steve Jablonsky (born October 9, 1970) is an American composer for film, television and video games, best known for his musical scores in the Transformers film series. Some of his frequent collaboration partners include film directors Michael Bay and Peter Berg, and fellow composer Hans Zimmer.

Early life 
Jablonsky's mother was born in a Japanese internment camp. He went to the University of California, Berkeley for college and studied computer science at first, but switched to music composition a year later. After graduation, he became an intern at Hans Zimmer's Remote Control Productions, after cold calling the studio to ask if they needed any help. During that time, Jablonsky met Harry Gregson-Williams, a fellow composer of Zimmer, and started working as his assistant. Later he became more engaged with Zimmer and started composing for works such as Desperate Housewives and the Transformers film series.

Career 
Jablonsky has composed the soundtracks to the films The Texas Chainsaw Massacre (2003), Steamboy (2004), The Island (2005), Transformers (2007), D-War (2007), Transformers: Revenge of the Fallen (2009), Transformers: Dark of the Moon (2011), Battleship (2012), Ender's Game (2013) (replacing renowned film composer James Horner), Transformers: Age of Extinction (2014), and Transformers: The Last Knight (2017). He was also a contributor on Team America: World Police (2004) among many others. In addition, he helped compose some of the music to the video game Metal Gear Solid 2: Sons of Liberty, and composed the theme music for BBC's Seven Wonders of the Industrial World in 2003. He also has written music for the television show Desperate Housewives (2004 - 2012) since the fourth episode. His track "Trailblazing" served as the opening theme for WrestleMania X8 and WrestleMania XIX, as well as the soundtrack to the TNA Hall of Fame induction of Sting.

Jablonsky also wrote the music for Command & Conquer 3: Tiberium Wars, taking the place of the former Command & Conquer music composer Frank Klepacki, who was unable to write the game's score due to his involvement with Universe at War: Earth Assault.

Jablonsky has worked for Harry Gregson-Williams at Media Ventures, the music production company which was conceived and founded by Jay Rifkin and Hans Zimmer, for seven years. His most recent projects include the scores for the South Korean film D-War, Gears of War 3 for the Xbox 360 gaming console, and music for The Sims 3.

Currently, Jablonsky is employed at Zimmer's studio, Remote Control Productions, having been mentored by the company's members Zimmer and Nick Glennie-Smith, as well as former members Harry Gregson-Williams and Klaus Badelt.

In February 2015, Jablonsky was hired to compose the score for the film The Last Witch Hunter. He also composed the soundtrack for Teenage Mutant Ninja Turtles: Out of the Shadows, the sequel to Teenage Mutant Ninja Turtles, and the 2016 Peter Berg film Deepwater Horizon, starring Mark Wahlberg and Kurt Russell.

Filmography

Film

Additional music credits

Television

Video games

References

External links 
 
 

1970 births
American film score composers
American male film score composers
American musicians of Japanese descent
American people of Polish descent
American television composers
La-La Land Records artists
Living people
Male television composers
Place of birth missing (living people)
University of California, Berkeley alumni
Varèse Sarabande Records artists
Video game composers